Juan José Navarro y Búfalo, 1st Marquess of Victoria, OSJ (Messina, 30 November 1687 – Isla de León Cadiz, 5 February 1772) was a Spanish military officer who served as first Captain general of the Navy from 1750 to 1772. A leading proponent of naval reform, he provided much of the practical curriculum for the Academia de Guardias Marinas, established in 1717 to provide professional training for Spanish marine officers.

Personal details 
Juan José Navarro y Búfalo was born in Messina on 30 November 1687, eldest son of Ignacio de Navarro y Viana (died  1708), a captain in the army of the Spanish-ruled Kingdom of Naples, and Livia Búfalo, a Sicilian noblewoman. He had at least one younger brother, Ramón, who was killed in North Africa in 1708.

In 1711, he married María Josefa Gauset, a native of Lleida; they had two daughters, Ignacia and Rosalía, who married another Spanish admiral, Gutierre de Hevia, and inherited her father's title.

Career

Navarro was commissioned into his father's company and when the War of the Spanish Succession began in 1701, his regiment served in Northern Italy where it formed part of the Franco-Spanish Bourbon army and was present at Luzzara and the Siege of Turin. When Spanish forces were withdrawn from Italy following the 1707 Convention of Milan, he took part in an expedition to relieve Spanish Oran in modern Algeria, where his brother Ramón was killed and his father died in captivity. Navarro himself returned to Spain and fought at Almenar in July 1710 and Zaragoza in August, where he was one of 7,000 Spanish prisoners.   
 
After the Peace of Utrecht in 1714, he became captain of his late father's company, and participated in the pacification of Catalonia. He then joined the Spanish Navy and with the help of José Patiño, in 1717 was appointed as an instructor at the newly established Academia de Guardias Marinas based in Cadiz. When the War of the Quadruple Alliance began in 1718, he was part of the naval force that supported the invasion of Sicily and was present at the Battle of Cape Passaro in August, a comprehensive defeat by the Royal Navy that sparked a life-long interest in naval reform and tactics. 

In 1732, he participated in the recapture of Oran under the Duke of Montemar and played an important role in covering the landing by the use of his naval guns. As a result of his academic work, in 1740 he was admitted to the Real Academia Española.

During the War of the Austrian Succession in 1742, his squadron was taking supplies to the Spanish army in Italy when the British Mediterranean Fleet forced him to take refuge in the French naval base at Toulon. He remained there until February 1744, when he was ordered to combine with the French Levant Fleet, break the blockade and escape into the Atlantic. The Franco-Spanish force beat off a poorly co-ordinated British attack in the Battle of Toulon (1744) and in recognition of this, Navarro was promoted to lieutenant general, or Teniente Géneral. However, Navarro claimed he had been insufficiently supported by his allies, and Philip V of Spain made him Marqués de la Victoria, or Marquis of Victory, a title which underlined the Spanish belief that the battle was a success negated by the poor performance of the French. 

After the battle his fleet remained blockaded in Cartagena, by a fleet of 21 ships under Rear-Admiral William Rowley and on 15 March 1750, he was appointed first Captain general of the Navy. Six years later he finished his Diccionario demostrativo de la configuración y anatomía de toda arquitectura naval moderna. 

In 1759, he commanded the convoy of 36 ships that brought Charles III, the new King of Spain, from Naples to Spain. His flagship was the El Fénix (80 guns) with his son-in-law Gutierre de Hevia as captain. His last assignment in 1768 was leading a squadron of nine ships which escorted Infanta María Louisa to her husband Leopold II, Holy Roman Emperor, and brought back Maria Luisa of Parma, who was to marry Charles IV of Spain. On 5 February 1772, Navarro died in Cadiz of Gangrene at the age of 84.

References

Sources
 
 
 
 

Captain generals of the Navy
Spanish admirals
Marquesses of Spain
1687 births
1772 deaths
Spanish military personnel of the War of the Spanish Succession
Spanish military personnel of the War of the Austrian Succession
Deaths from gangrene